Gerrit Pels (1893, Woerden – 1966, Leiden?) was a Dutch astronomer, a lifelong member of the scientific staff of the Leiden Observatory.

After following secondary school in Utrecht, he was appointed "computer" at the Leiden observatory in 1919. Starting circa 1924, he studied Jupiter's Galilean satellites, minor planets, comets, and the proper motions of faint stars, in particular members of the Hyades cluster. He computed orbital characteristics for many of the minor planets discovered by Hendrik van Gent. Much of his work he did in collaboration with his wife, Helena Kluyver (1909-2001). She, together with Jan Oort, published their work on the Hyades cluster in 1975, 9 years after his death, in the journal Astronomy and Astrophysics .

The main-belt asteroid 1667 Pels was named in his honour by discoverer and colleague Hendrik van Gent.

References

External links 
 NASA ADS list of publications by G. Pels

1893 births
1966 deaths
20th-century Dutch astronomers
People from Woerden
People from Leiden